French Polynesia competed at the 2017 World Championships in Athletics in London, Great Britain, from 4–13 August 2017.

Results

Women
Track and road events

References

Nations at the 2017 World Championships in Athletics
World Championships in Athletics
French Polynesia at the World Championships in Athletics